Howrah railway division is one of the four railway divisions under Eastern Railway zone and South Eastern Railway zone of Indian Railways. This railway division was formed on 1854 and its headquarter is located at Howrah in the state of West Bengal of India.

Howrah railway division, Sealdah railway division and Malda railway division are the other railway divisions under ER Zone headquartered at Kolkata.

List of busiest Non Suburban railway stations
This list includes the top 10 busiest NSG (Non Suburban Group) category railway stations in Howrah division.

List of railway stations and towns 
The list includes the stations under the Howrah railway division and their station category.

Stations closed for Passengers -

References

 
Divisions of Indian Railways
1854 establishments in India

Rail transport in Howrah